Brian McAuley (born 1941) is an American entrepreneur and co-founder of Nextel Communications.

In 1987, McAuley was a cellular executive when he and lawyer Morgan O'Brien founded Fleet Call, a telecom company, in New Jersey. It was renamed Nextel Communications in 1993, and grew rapidly with the support of Motorola, before merging with Sprint Corporation in 2005 for $35 billion. The new company became the third-largest wireless network operator in the United States. McAuley previously served as president and CEO of Nextel Communications for seven years. He also founded Boston-based mobile radio systems operator NeoWorld Communications in 1999, and served as its president and CEO. It was acquired by Nextel for $276 million in 2003.

He is currently chairman of NASDAQ-listed Pacific DataVision, Inc., provider of mobile workforce management solutions.
He is also a director for NYSE-listed United Rentals, Inc. and sits on the board for many non-profits.

Brian McAuley holds a bachelor's degree in Business Administration from Adelphi University, and resides in Franklin Lakes, New Jersey.

See also
 Nextel Communications

References

External links
Former Nextel execs embark on another PTT venture—and possibly broadband—with Pacific DataVision
Pacific DataVision, Inc.

Adelphi University alumni
Living people
1941 births